This is the discography of rapper Freeway.

Albums

Studio albums

Collaborative albums

Mixtapes

LPs
2002: The Hits, the Unreleased & Freestyles
2005: Heavyweight Flow
2006: G-Unit Radio 19
2007: Live Free, Die Hard (Hosted by Don Cannon)
2008: Freeway Is Back (Hosted By DJ Woogie & DJ Ian)
2009: Month of Madness
2009: The Calm Before The Storm
2009: The Beat Made Me Do It (Hosted by Don Cannon, Produced by Jake One)
2010: Freelapse
2011: The Intermission (Hosted By Superstar Jay & DJ Love Dinero)
2012: Freedom of Speech (Hosted by Team Early & Karmaloop)
2013: Write My Wrongs (with The Jacka)
2015: Freemix (with Scholito)
2016: Fear of a Free Planet

EPs
2011: StatikFree (with Statik Selektah)
2012: Black Santa
2014: Broken Ankles (with Girl Talk)
2018: The Black Gang EP (with Kid Kold)

Bootlegs
2009: The Month of Madness
2009: Streetz Is Mine
2010: This Is My Life

Singles

Solo

Collaboration

Guest appearances

2000–05

2000
2000: "1-900-Hustler" (Jay-Z featuring Beanie Sigel, Memphis Bleek & Freeway)

2001
2001: "Coming for You" (DJ Clue? featuring Beanie Sigel & Freeway)
2001: "Think It's a Game" (Beanie Sigel featuring Freeway, Jay-Z & Young Chris)
2001: "Hate Blood" (Jermaine Dupri featuring Jadakiss & Freeway)
2001: "More Than A Woman" (Just Blaze Remix) with Aaliyah Planned but not recorded due to the death of Aaliyah the same day the recording was scheduled

2002
2002: "You Got Me" (Mariah Carey featuring Jay-Z & Freeway)
2002: "As One" (Jay-Z featuring Beanie Sigel, Memphis Bleek, Freeway, Young Gunz, Peedi Crakk, Sparks & Rell)

2003
2003: "My Love" (Juelz Santana featuring Freeway)
2003: "Here Comes the Fuzz" (Mark Ronson featuring Jack White, Freeway & Nikka Costa)
2003: "Just Blaze, Bleek & Free" (Memphis Bleek featuring Freeway)
2003: "Ride Up" (Kendrick Lamar featuring Freeway & Joe Budden)

2004
2004: "Parade" (Young Gunz featuring Freeway)
2004: "Art & Life (Chi-Roc)" (Twista featuring Memphis Bleek, Young Chris & Freeway)
2004: "Two Words" (Kanye West featuring Mos Def, Freeway & The Boys Choir of Harlem)

2005
2005: "I Can't Go on This Way) (Beanie Sigel featuring Freeway & Young Chris)
2005: "State to State" (Paul Wall featuring Freeway)
2005: "Get Your Grind On" (Notorious B.I.G. featuring Big Pun, Fat Joe & Freeway)

2006–10

2006
2006: "What You Want" (LL Cool J featuring Freeway)
2006: "Where You At?" (DJ Khaled featuring Freeway & Clipse)
2006: "Soñando" <small> (Polaco featuring Freeway)
2006: "Liberty Bell" (DJ Clue? featuring Beanie Sigel, Freeway & Cassidy)
2006: "Fast Forward" (Jody Breeze featuring Freeway)

2007
2007: "Criminal Opera" (Rick Ross featuring Freeway & Dre)
2007: "On the Grind" (Paul Wall featuring Freeway & Crys Wall)
2007: "Minnie Minnie" (Turf Talk featuring Freeway)
2007: "Cannon RMX" (DJ Drama featuring Lil Wayne, Willie the Kid, Freeway & T.I.)
2007: "That Filling" (Hezekiah featuring Freeway)

2008
2008: "Leave Her Alone" (Nate Dogg featuring Memphis Bleek, Freeway & Young Chris)
2008: "Don't Act Like You Don't Know" (Skillz featuring Freeway)
2008: "Drugs Crime Gorillaz" (Termanology featuring Freeway & Sheek Louch)
2008: "All 2gether Now" (Statik Selektah featuring Freeway, Peedi Crakk & Young Chris)
2008: "Run (Remix)" (Ghostface Killah featuring Jadakiss, Lil Wayne, Raekwon & Freeway)
2008: "The Truth" (Jake One featuring Freeway & Brother Ali)

2009
2011: "Say It" (Termanology featuring Sheek Louch, Joell Ortiz, Bun B, Freeway & Saigon)
2009: "They Don't Know" (The Jacka featuring Freeway)
2009: "DoDo (Remix) (Snoop Dogg featuring Beanie Sigel, Freeway, Soopafly, E-White, Kokane & Jellyroll)
2009: "Project Leaders" (Trife Diesel featuring Freeway & Termanology)
2009: "Best @it" (Brother Ali featuring Freeway & Joell Ortiz)
2009: "Where's My Opponent" (Beanie Sigel featuring Omilio Sparks & Freeway)
2009: "Ready for War" (Beanie Sigel featuring Freeway & Young Chris)
2009: "Sicker Than Your Average" (Beanie Sigel featuring Freeway)
2009: "Move Back/The Reason" (Sha Stimuli featuring Freeway & Young chris)

2010
2010: "Night People" (Statik Selektah featuring Freeway, Red Cafe & Masspike Miles)
2010: "Pistolvania" (Vinnie Paz featuring Freeway & Jakk Frost)
2010: "Anything 2 Survive" (Freddie Gibbs featuring Freeway, Sly Polaroid & Adrian)
2010: "Dreams" (Outlawz featuring Freeway)
2010: "Cyphr" (Wale featuring Young Chris, Freeway & Beanie Sigel)
2010: "Life Is What You Make It" (1982 featuring Saigon & Freeway)

2010–15

2011
2011: "U Know" (Reks featuring Freeway)
2011: "You Take Her" (Termanology featuring Freeway & Havoc)
2011: "Victorious People" (Zion I & The Grouch featuring Freeway & the R.O.D. Project)
2011: "Roses" (Tek & Steele featuring Freeway)
2011: "Forfeit" (Ro Spit featuring Freeway)
2011: "Lay Low" (DJ Drama featuring Young Chris, Meek Mill & Freeway)

2012
2012: "Lights Off" (Trae featuring Rod C, Jay'Ton & Freeway)
2012: "Charlie Sheen" (Blanco & Nipsey Hussle featuring Freeway & Lil Rue)
2012: "Heard About It" (Ground Up featuring Freeway)
2012: "Highs & Lows (remix)" (¡Mayday! featuring Freeway & J.Nics)
2012: "Lord Knows"  (Jarren Benton featuring Freeway & Planet IV)
2012: "Sucka MC's" (Slaughterhouse featuring Freeway) On the House
2012: "Deal With It" (Boaz featuring Freeway) Bases Loaded
2012: "Fresh" (Lee Mazin featuring Freeway) LoveLEE
2012: "Danger" (Journalist 103 featuring Freeway) Reporting Live
2012: "From the Streets" (Termanology and Lil' Fame featuring Freeway) Fizzyology

2013
2013: "Change Coming" (Chill Moody featuring Freeway) RFM
2013: "Family All Over" (Louie V Gutta featuring Freeway) Worth The Wait
2013: "Walk In" (Lee Mazin featuring Freeway) In My Own Lane
2013: "Didn't Know" (Roc Marciano featuring Freeway) Marci Beaucoup
2013: "Slave of Allah" (Yusuf Abdul-Mateen featuring Freeway) Rhyme Dawah
2013: "Nasze 5 Minut" (Grand Reserve featuring Freeway & JWP)

2015
2015: "Memories" (DJ Kay Slay featuring Freeway, Young Buck and Lil' Fame) The Industry Purge
2015: "M.G.D." (E.G.O. featuring Freeway and Montega) Maximum Pressure

2016–20

2016
2016: "Strawberry Mansion" (Lushlife & CSLSX featuring Freeway) Ritualize
2016: "King Jack" (Philthy Rich featuring Freeway & Paul Wall) Real Niggas Back in Style
2016 : "Fucc Em" (Nipsey Hussle featuring Freeway & Cuzzy Capone) "Famous Lies And Unpopular Truths EP"

2017
2017: "Wise Guys" (Kool G Rap featuring Lil Fame & Freeway) Return of the Don
2017: "Prisoner" (Sean Price featuring Freeway) Imperius Rex

2018
2018: "Amanda" (Kid Kold featuring Ghostface Killah & Freeway, produced by DJ Mercilless) The Block Gang

2020
2020: “Oh La Aye” (San Quinn featuring Freeway, produced by Monk Hits)
2020: "Bills Ain't Bossing You (I.T.C.H.)" (One Be Lo featuring Freeway, produced by Eric G)

Other songs
2002: "8 Miles and Runnin'" (with Jay-Z)
2005: "Where U Been" (feat. DMX)
2007: "Still Got Love"
2007: "It's Over"
2007: "Step Back" (feat. Lil Wayne)
2008: "How We Ride" (guest on White Van Music by Jake One)
2008: "The Truth" (feat. Brother Ali; guest on White Van Music by Jake One)
2008: "Reparations" (feat. Lloyd Banks)
2009: "When I Die" (feat. James Blunt)
2009: "Rap Money"  (feat. Thee Tom Hardy & Young Chris)
2010: "We International" (feat. Drew Deezy, Thai & Izreal)
2010: "Kush Dreams" (feat. Outlawz for Killuminati 2K10)

References

External links
 

Discographies of American artists
Cash Money Records artists
Hip hop discographies